is a railway station in Midori-ku, Nagoya,  Aichi Prefecture, Japan, operated by Meitetsu.

Lines
Chūkyō-keibajō-mae Station is served by the Meitetsu Nagoya Main Line and is 51.4 kilometers from the terminus of the line at Toyohashi Station.

Station layout
The station has two elevated side platforms with the station building underneath. The station has automated ticket machines, Manaca automated turnstiles and is staffed.

Platforms

Adjacent stations

Station history
Chūkyō-keibajō-mae Station was opened on 15 July 1953.

Passenger statistics
In fiscal 2017, the station was used by an average of 9470 passengers daily. .

Surrounding area
 Chukyo Racecourse
Nagoya College

See also
 List of Railway Stations in Japan

References

External links

 Official web page 

Railway stations in Japan opened in 1953
Railway stations in Aichi Prefecture
Stations of Nagoya Railroad
Railway stations in Nagoya